The nance (Byrsonima crassifolia) is a fruit-bearing tree native to the tropical regions of North and South America. 

Nance may also refer to:

Places
 Nance, Jura, France
 Nance, Missouri, United States
 Nance County, Nebraska, United States

People
 Nance (surname)
 Nancy Coolen, singer for the Dutch Eurodance act Twenty 4 Seven

Arts, entertainment, and media
 Nance (film), a 1920 British silent film directed by Albert Ward
 The Nance, a play by Douglas Carter Beane

Botany
 Nance, fruit of other trees in the genus Byrsonima
 Nance, the legume Albizia pistaciifolia

See also

 
 Nanci
 Nancey (disambiguation)
 Nancy (disambiguation)
 Mance (disambiguation)